George Yeo Yong-Boon  (born 13 September 1954) is a Singaporean former politician and brigadier-general who served as Minister for Foreign Affairs between 2004 and 2011.

Yeo served in the Singapore Army and later Republic of Singapore Air Force (RSAF) between 1976 and 1988 and attained the rank Brigadier-General. He also served as Chief of Staff – Air Staff between 1985 and 1986, and Director of Joint Operations and Planning at the Ministry of Defence (MINDEF) between 1986 and 1988. 

A former member of the governing People's Action Party (PAP), Yeo was the Member of Parliament (MP) representing the Bedok Reservoir–Punggol ward of Aljunied GRC between 1988 and 2011. He also served as Minister for Information and the Arts between 1990 and 1999, Minister for Health between 1994 and 1997, Minister for Trade and Industry between 1999 and 2004 and Minister for Foreign Affairs between 2004 and 2011. 

On 10 May 2011, Yeo announced that he would be retiring from politics and had declined to participate in both 2011 presidential election and 2023 presidential election.

Education
Yeo was educated at St. Stephen's School, St. Patrick's School—where he topped in his class for his O-Level and St. Joseph's Institution before graduating from Christ's College at the University of Cambridge in 1976, majoring in engineering, under the President's Scholarship and Singapore Armed Forces Overseas Scholarship.

He subsequently went on to complete a Master in Business Administration degree from Harvard Business School in 1985 as a Baker Scholar.

Military career
Upon returning from the United Kingdom, Yeo served as a commissioned officer in the Singapore Armed Forces (SAF). He served as a signals officer in the Singapore Army, before transferring to the Republic of Singapore Air Force (RSAF). 

When Yeo returned to Singapore, he served as Chief of Staff – Air Staff between 1985 and 1986, and Director of Joint Operations and Planning at the Ministry of Defence (MINDEF) between 1986 and 1988. He also led the team which conceptualised the SAFTI Military Institute.

Yeo left the SAF in 1988 and attained the rank Brigadier-General, before entering politics.

Political career
Yeo made his political debut in the 1988 general election as part of a three-member PAP team contesting in the newly-created Aljunied GRC and won.

Following his election into Parliament, Yeo served in various ministries, including the Ministry of Finance, Ministry of Information, Communications and the Arts, Ministry of Health, Ministry of Trade and Industry and the Ministry of Foreign Affairs.

Yeo represented the Eurasian community in the Cabinet at their request. Yeo was the chairman of the PAP's youth wing from 1991 to 2000, which saw a renaming to Young PAP (YPAP) in 1993. As an enticement for joining the YPAP, he said people joining the YPAP could take positions different from central party leadership.

Yeo and his Aljunied GRC team first faced a team of Singapore Democratic Party (then the largest opposition party led by Chiam See Tong) in 1988 (which led by Ashleigh Seow (the son of Workers' Party candidate for Eunos Group Representation Constituency Francis Seow)) and 1997. In 2006, the party faced WP (led by the party's chair Sylvia Lim) and won with the election's narrowest margin, with 56.1% to 43.9%. However, in the 2011 general election (held 7 May), the WP team (which now led by then secretary-general Low Thia Khiang) won the election 54.7% to 45.3%, resulting in his election defeat as well as the loss of his ministerial appointment. Yeo, along with a co-anchor minister Lim Hwee Hua, were the first two cabinet ministers in post-independence Singapore, and after the 1963 election, to be defeated in the election and consequently losing their parliamentary seats to the opposition.

On 5 October 2011, Yeo stepped down from the PAP's Central Executive Committee (the party's governing body). During his announcement, Yeo stated that he declined running for presidency later that year, cited that he was a "free spirit" and he was not "temperamentally suited for such a job", despite being popular in online and have "a flood of support" on post-election. He although stated on his Facebook page that he was "thinking hard" about the possibility of becoming a candidate on 1 June, but however, on 15 June, Yeo confirmed that he declined standing for presidency.

Minister for Information, Communications, and the Arts 
As Minister for Information, Communications and the Arts, he liberalised the use of dialects in the local film industry, which paved the way for a generation of local film directors and producers. He also oversaw the design and construction of the Esplanade Theatres on the Bay and the new National Library.

In the 1990s, Yeo pushed for widespread adoption of internet infrastructure in Singapore, stating that it was important for Singapore to retain its role as a regional hub. Its geographical advantage would matter less, and its infrastructural advantage in the exchange of information and ideas would matter more. In 1995, he defended government censorship of the Internet even as it proved technologically challenging to do so: "Censorship can no longer be 100% effective, but even if it is only 20% effective, we should not stop censoring." In what he described as an "anti-pollution measure in cyberspace", Yeo transferred censorship authority from the Telecommunication Authority of Singapore (TAS) to the Singapore Broadcasting Authority (SBA), which was to "concentrate on areas which may undermine public morals, political stability or religious harmony in Singapore". Yeo said the government would focus on monitoring internet communications that broadcast material to millions of users rather than the "narrowcasting" of private communications between individuals.

Minister for Trade and Industry 
As Minister for Trade and Industry, Yeo led his team to successfully negotiate the Free Trade Agreement with the United States, Japan, Australia and other countries. Yeo proposed the idea of having Integrated Resorts (IRs) in Singapore, which would include casinos, which was intensely debated for a year. This paved the way for the 2 IRs in Singapore, Resorts World Sentosa and Marina Bay Sands at the Marina Promenade. He later shared with a group of university students during a dialogue that his late father had a problem with gambling and the decision to push for the gaming resorts was personally a very difficult one. He said that policy making often involved a choice between 'evils'.

Post-political career
Yeo has been a visiting scholar at the Lee Kuan Yew School of Public Policy since 2011.

Yeo was involved in reviving the ancient Buddhist university, Nalanda University, in Bihar, India. He was chancellor of Nalanda University and member of the University Governing Board, and the governing board's International Advisory Panel. In November 2016, he resigned as the chancellor of Nalanda University accusing the Indian government of failing to maintain the university's autonomy.

Yeo moved to the private sector in Hong Kong since leaving politics in 2011. Yeo joined the Kuok Group as Senior Advisor, and vice chairman of its subsidiary Kerry Group (HK) Pte Ltd in January 2012. In August 2012, he became chairman and executive director of Kerry Logistics Network. He was also a director of Kerry Holdings and non-executive director of Wilmar International. Yeo also served as the non-executive director of AIA Group.

In 2013, Yeo was appointed as a non-official member of the newly established Hong Kong Economic Development Commission.

In 2014, Yeo was named as a member of the Vatican's Council for the Economy. He was amongst the first lay Catholics appointed by the Vatican to oversee organisational and economic issues faced by the Holy See. At that time, Yeo was the only Asian appointed to the commission. 

Yeo is currently a member of the Foundation Board of the World Economic Forum, the Nicolas Berggruen Institute's 21st Century Council and the International Advisory Board of IESE Business School(IAB). 

He also takes the following advisory roles in Singapore:
 Advisor to the Sun Yat Sen Nanyang Memorial Hall
 Advisor to the Teochew Poit Ip Huay Kuan
 Patron of Lasalle College of the Arts
V3 Group announced on 23 August 2020 that George Yeo will join as Senior Advisor. He acts as an independent board director of Hong Kong-listed AIA and Nasdaq-listed e-commerce platform Pinduoduo, the largest agriculture platform in China.

Awards and recognition
In 2012, Yeo was awarded the Padma Bhushan, by India, the Order of Sikatuna, with the rank of Datu (Grand Cross), by the Philippines, and the Honorary Officer of the Order of Australia, by Australia.

Personal life
A Roman Catholic, Yeo married lawyer Jennifer Leong Lai Peng in 1984. The couple have three sons and a daughter. Yeo also has a niece named Gwendoline Yeo, who was an actress and musician.

In 2004, their youngest son, who has struggled with childhood leukemia since age three, received a bone marrow transplant at St. Jude Children's Research Hospital in Memphis, Tennessee. Recognising the difficulties faced by families in such situations, Leong founded the Viva Foundation to help children with cancer to improve the survival rate and cure of children with cancer, especially childhood leukemia, in Singapore and Southeast Asia. In May 2006, a memorandum of understanding was signed between St. Jude Children's Research Hospital, National University of Singapore (NUS), National University Hospital (NUH) in Singapore, and the VIVA Foundation for Children with Cancer (VIVA).

Yeo is an avid jogger and has participated in the Singapore Marathon 10 km run. He is a student of Taiji, an internal Chinese martial art, and describes himself as "a bit of a Taoist".

Bibliography
 George Yeo on Bonsai, Banyan and the Tao (World Scientific, 2016)

References

Sources
George Yeo, George Yeo on Bonsai, Banyan and the Tao, edited by Asad-ul Iqbal Latif and Lee Huay Leng, Singapore: World Scientific Publishing, 2015, 686 pages.

Justin Corfield, Historical Dictionary of Singapore, Lanham, Maryland: Scarecrow Press, 2011, pp. 297–298.

Justin Corfield and Robin Corfield, Encyclopedia of Singapore, Lanham, Maryland: Scarecrow Press, 2006, pp. 247–248.

Low Kar Tiang (editor), Who's Who in Singapore, Singapore, 2003, p. 467.

External links
 Profile at Singapore Cabinet website
 Profile at Singapore Ministry of Foreign Affairs website

1954 births
Living people
Alumni of Christ's College, Cambridge
Harvard Business School alumni
Members of the Cabinet of Singapore
Singaporean people of Chinese descent
Members of the Parliament of Singapore
People's Action Party politicians
President's Scholars
Republic of Singapore Air Force generals
Saint Joseph's Institution, Singapore alumni
Singaporean people of Teochew descent
Singaporean Roman Catholics
Singaporean sinologists
Honorary Officers of the Order of Australia
Recipients of the Padma Bhushan in public affairs
Ministers for Foreign Affairs of Singapore
Ministers for Health of Singapore
Ministers for Trade and Industry of Singapore